The Tirah also spelled Terah also called the Tirah Valley, is a mountainous tract located in the Khyber district, lying between the Khyber Pass and the Khanki Valley in Pakistan.

Society
Lying close to the Afghan-Pak border and difficult terrain, control of Tirah for the government of Pakistan has been difficult. In 2003, for the first time since the independence of Pakistan, Army troops entered the Tirah valley.

The dominant ethnic group here are the Pashtuns. There are minority communities of referred to as Hamsaya (protected peoples) such as the Sikh community who are mainly involved in trading and other professions.

History

The ancient inhabitants of Tirah and the surrounding areas were the Tirahis, who were driven out of the country by Pir Roshan; and a remnant of them fled to Nangrahar. Soon afterwards, in 1619 or 1620, Mahabat Khan, Subahdar of Kabul under the emperor Jahangir, treacherously massacred 300 Daulatzai Orakzai, who were Roshania converts; and, during his absence on a visit to Jahangir at Rohtas, Ghairat Khan was sent with a large force via Kohat to invade Tirah. He advanced to the foot of the Sampagha pass, which was held by the Roshanias under Ihdad and the Daulatzai under Malik Tor.

The Rajputs attacked the former and the latter were assailed by Ghairat Khan's own troops, but the Mughal forces were repulsed with great loss. Six years later, however, Muzaffar Khan, son of Khwaja Abdul Hasan, then Sibahddr of Kabul, marched against Ihdad by the Sugawand pass and Gardez, and after five or six months' fighting Ihdad was shot and his head sent to Jahangir. His followers then took refuge in the Lowaghar; and subsequently Abdul Kadir, Ihdad's son, and his widow Alai, returned to Tirah. The death of Jahangir in 1627 was the signal for a general rising of the Pashtuns against the Mughal domination. Muzaffar Khan was attacked on his way from Peshawar to Kabul, and severely handled by the Orakzai and Afridis, while Abdul Kadir attacked Peshawar, plundered the city, and invested the citadel.

Abdul Kadir was, however, compelled by the jealousy of the Afghans to abandon the siege and retire to Tirah, whence he was induced to come into Peshawar. There he died in 1635. The Mughals sent a fresh expedition against his followers in Tirah; and Yusuf, the Afridi, and Asar Mir, the Omkzai chief, were at length induced to submit, and received lands at Panipat near Delhi. Simultaneously operations were undertaken in Kurram. Yet, in spite of these measures, Mir Yakut, the imperial Diwan at Peshawar, was sent to Tirah in 1658 to repress an Orakzai and Afridi revolt. Since the decay of the Mughal empire Tirah has been virtually independent, though owning at times a nominal allegiance to Kabul.

Tirah was chiefly notable as the scene of the Tirah Campaign that the British launched in 1897. It was a cul-de-sac in the mountains and the difficulty of its passes and the fierceness of its inhabitants had hitherto preserved it inviolable from all invaders.

According to a legend a group of Pashtuns living in Tirah, the Orakzai, got their name from an exiled prince from far away Persia. They include 18 tribes. Those 18 tribes are collectively known as Orakzai. But the greater part of Tirah's population belong to the Afridi tribe. 

A sub tribe known as the Oriya Khel belonged to the Zaka Khel clan of the Afridi tribe. They inhabited the Tirah Valley and are now located in Cherat Saleh Khana. Although they now fall under the Khattak tribe, the Oriya Khel acknowledge their lineage and still continue to call themselves afridi. This can be proven as the land records of Saleh Khana showed they initially belonged to afridis and to this day the inhabitants have not changed. further more the villagers of saleh khana still wear their turbans and grow their moustache like afridis, customs which have been passed down by the elders.

Geography 

Tirah comprises an area of some six to seven hundred square miles and includes under this general name all the valleys lying round the source of the Bara River. The five chief valleys are Maidan, Rajgul, Waran, Bara and Mastura.

Centuries of detritus accumulated in this basin have filled it up with rich alluvial soil and made it one of the most fertile valleys on the frontier. All its alluvial slopes are terraced and revetted and irrigated till every yard is made productive. Here and there dotted about in clusters all over the plain are square-built two storey mud and timber houses, standing in the shade of gigantic walnut and mulberry trees. Up on the hillsides surrounding the Maidan basin are wild olives in wide-grown clumps, almost amounting to forest, and occasional pomegranates.

Higher still are the blue pines; but below on the shelving plains are nothing but fruit trees. Rajgul Valley lies north of Maidan, from which it is separated by a steep valley and well-wooded spur, eight to nine thousand feet high, and west of the Bara Valley, which it joins at Dwatoi. It is inhabited by the Kuki Khel Afridis. The Waran Valley is another valley about the same size as Maidan, lying east of it, and separated from it by the Tseri-Kandao Pass. It was the home of the Afridi mullah Sayad Akbar. and is the country of the Aka Khels. After the junction of the Rajgul and Maidan drainage at Dwatoi, the united stream receives the name of Bara, and the valley through which it flows down to its exit in the Peshawar Valley is also known by this name.

The heat of the Bara Valley in summer is said to be excessive, malaria is prevalent, and mosquitoes very troublesome, so the hamlets are deserted and the Afridis migrate to the pleasant heights of Maidan. The Mastura Valley occupies the southern half of Tirah, and is inhabited by the Orakzais. The Orakzais live, for the most part, in the Miranzai Valley, in the winter, and retreat to Mastura, like the Afridis, during the summer months.

The chief passes in Tirah are the Sampagha Pass (6,500 ft), separating the Khanki Valley from the Mastura Valley; the Arhanga Pass (6,99E ft.), separating Mastura Valley from Maidan; Saran Sar (8,650 ft), leading from the Zakka Khel portion of Maidan into the Bara Valley; the Tseri Kandao (8,575 ft), separating Maidan from the Waran Valley, and the Sapri Pass (5,190 ft), leading from the east of the Mastura Valley into the Bara Valley in the direction of Mamanai. The whole of Tirah was thoroughly explored and mapped at the time of the Tirah Campaign.

See also 
 Tirah Campaign
 Tirah Memorial

References 

Regions of Pakistan
Valleys of Khyber Pakhtunkhwa